Felix Anthony "Gus" Mancuso (April 11, 1914 – August 16, 2003) was a Canadian professional ice hockey forward who played 47 games in the National Hockey League for the Montreal Canadiens and New York Rangers between 1937 and 1943. The rest of his career, which lasted from 1933 to 1949, was spent in various minor leagues.

Career statistics

Regular season and playoffs

External links
 

1914 births
2003 deaths
Canadian expatriate ice hockey players in the United States
Canadian ice hockey forwards
Hershey Bears players
Hollywood Wolves players
Ice hockey people from Ontario
Los Angeles Monarchs players
Montreal Canadiens players
New Haven Eagles players
New York Rangers players
Ontario Hockey Association Senior A League (1890–1979) players
Providence Reds players
Sportspeople from Niagara Falls, Ontario